The Ghost is a 1982 West German drama film directed by and starring Herbert Achternbusch. It was entered into the 33rd Berlin International Film Festival.

Cast
 Herbert Achternbusch as Ober
 Annamirl Bierbichler as Oberin
 Werner Schroeter as Bischof
 Kurt Raab as Poli
 Dietmar Schneider as Zisti
 Josef Bierbichler as Römer / Landwirt
 Franz Baumgartner as Römer / Vertreter
 Alois Hitzenbichler as Römer / Priester
 Judit Achternbusch as Novizin
 Rut Achternbusch as Novizin
 Gabi Geist as Vertretersgattin
 Gunter Freyse as Mann
 Ann Poppel as Frau

References

External links

1982 films
1982 drama films
1980s German-language films
1980s avant-garde and experimental films
West German films
Films directed by Herbert Achternbusch
German avant-garde and experimental films
Films critical of religion
1980s German films